is the name of numerous Buddhist temples in Japan. Below is an incomplete list:

Hōun-ji in Sakai, Osaka Prefecture
Hōun-ji in Kamigōri, Hyōgo Prefecture
Hōun-ji in Kami, Hyōgo Prefecture